Altuğ Çelikbilek was the defending champion and successfully defended his title after Christopher O'Connell retired at 7–6(7–5), 3–1 down in the final.

Seeds

Draw

Finals

Top half

Bottom half

References

External links
Main draw
Qualifying draw

Porto Challenger - 1